La'Keisha Sutton (born November 18, 1990) is an American professional basketball player who plays for the Harlem Globetrotters. She played four seasons of college basketball for the University of South Carolina under coach Dawn Staley before playing professional basketball overseas and joining the Harlem Globetrotters.

Early life 
Sutton was born and raised Trenton, New Jersey. She grew up in Roger Gardens and Prospect Village, near where she spent a lot of time playing basketball as a kid at the West Ward Recreation Center. In middle school she got a scholarship to attend Stuart Country Day School in Princeton, NJ.

High school and college career 
Sutton attended Trenton Catholic Academy where she played four years while being coached by Khaliq Lewis El. Her senior year she was awarded the New Jersey Gatorade Player of the Year, Trenton Times Player of the Year and Trentonian Player of the Year. She averaged 19.6 points per game and was a four-time all-county first-team selection and twice earned All-State honors from the Associated Press. She was named MVP of the 2008 New Jersey State Championship game after leading her team to its second-straight title. Sutton scored 1,965 points during her career at Trenton Catholic Academy.

Sutton was Dawn Staley's first South Carolina Gamecock recruit in 2008 where she helped lead South Carolina to their first ever Sweet Sixteen appearance in 2012. She scored nearly 1,300 points over her four-year career and graduated in 2012 with a degree in broadcast communications. She earned the nickname Fan Favorite in college. Upon leaving college she became a WNBA prospect.

Professional career 
Sutton played professional basketball overseas in Taiwan, Finland, Ecuador, Germany, and Bulgaria before joining the Harlem Globetrotters in 2018. She is the ninth woman to play for the world-famous Harlem Globetrotters as Swish Sutton. She is also the first female Harlem Globetrotter from New Jersey.

Sutton is also the author of From The Projects To Fan Favorite: Made In Trenton.

Community 
Sutton hosted a 3-on-3 basketball tournament for 20 middle school students, during Brunswick Avenue Day in Trenton, New Jersey. She donated 50 basketballs as a Globetrotter to the West Ward Center in Trenton.

References 

1990 births
Living people
Basketball players from Trenton, New Jersey
Harlem Globetrotters players
South Carolina Gamecocks women's basketball players
Trenton Catholic Academy alumni
American expatriate basketball people in Taiwan
American expatriate basketball people in Finland
American expatriate basketball people in Ecuador
American expatriate basketball people in Germany
American expatriate basketball people in Bulgaria